Ole Bischof (born 27 August 1979 in Reutlingen) is a German judoka. He is trained by 1984 Olympic gold medalist Frank Wieneke.

Biography
Bischof began in the TSG Reutlingen with judo. He became German champion at the age of 18 in 1997 in the age-group U21. Four years later, in 2001, he won the title of German champion in the Men's category.  Following this, he won medals on more international competitions and became 2005 European champion.

Since 2001, Bischof has been competing in the team competitions for the TSV Abensberg. With the TSV Abensberg, he became team champion and 2006 European cup winner from 2002 to 2008.

For the Olympic Games 2004 in Athens, Ole was replaced Florian Wanner.  Bischof was the best placed German in the world rankings, with Wanner holding the title of world champion (2003 in Osaka/Japan).

During the Olympics, Ole defeated judokas such as Tiago Camilo who was the silver medallist in Sydney 2000 and Roman Gontyuk, the silver medallist of Athens 2004. Ole won the -81 kg Olympic game by defeating Kim Jae-Bum of South Korea. In the 2012 London Olympics Bischof won the silver medal, being defeated in the final by Kim Jae-Bum. He announced his retirement in September 2012.

In 2008 he appeared on the game show Schlag den Raab. He lost to Raab 3-63.

During his career he studied economics and graduated as a Diplom Volkswirt.

Achievements

References

External links

  
 
 
 
 
 
 Videos of Ole Bischof (judovision.org)

1979 births
Living people
German male judoka
Olympic judoka of Germany
Judoka at the 2008 Summer Olympics
Judoka at the 2012 Summer Olympics
Olympic gold medalists for Germany
Olympic medalists in judo
Olympic silver medalists for Germany
Medalists at the 2012 Summer Olympics
Medalists at the 2008 Summer Olympics
Universiade medalists in judo
People from Reutlingen
Sportspeople from Tübingen (region)
Universiade bronze medalists for Germany
Medalists at the 2003 Summer Universiade
21st-century German people